Area code 651 is the telephone numbering plan code for Saint Paul, Minnesota, and the eastern suburbs of the Twin Cities.  A dogleg portion also extends to the southeast along the Mississippi River to include cities such as Hastings.  The region was the fifth area code created in the state in 1998, when it was carved out of area code 612. 

From 1954 to 1996, 612 covered all of central Minnesota, stretching from border-to-border from Wisconsin to South Dakota. In 1996, nearly all of the 612 territory outside the Twin Cities became area code 320. This was intended as a long-term solution, but within a year, the proliferation of cell phones and pagers brought 612 back to the brink of exhaustion. It soon became apparent that the Twin Cities were growing far too quickly to stay in a single area code, forcing the creation of 651.

The dividing line between 612 and 651 largely follows the Mississippi River; generally, all of the metropolitan area east of the river transferred to 651, while the western half stayed in 612. An exception is the eastern half of the University of Minnesota, Twin Cities' campus, located in Falcon Heights. Due to an integrated telephone system serving both the Falcon Heights campus and the main campus in Minneapolis, the entire U of M remained in 612 after the 1998 split. 

The area code splits in the Twin Cities are unusual because they split along municipal, rather than central office, boundaries. This led to a sizable number of exchanges being divided between two area codes, and a few being divided among three. 

Even with the Twin Cities' continued growth, 651 is one of the few urbanized area codes without an overlay, making St. Paul one of the few large cities where seven-digit dialing would still be possible. Under current projections, it will stay that way for the foreseeable future; the latest NANPA projections do not include an exhaust date for 651.

Even with the split into four area codes (612, 651, 763 and 952), most of the Twin Cities region is still a single rate center. The four Twin Cities area codes comprise one of the largest local calling areas in the United States; with a few exceptions, no long-distance charges are applied from one part of the Twin Cities to another. Portions of area codes 320 and 507 are local calls from the Twin Cities as well.

Cities and communities

Afton
Apple Valley
Arden Hills
Bayport
Birchwood Village
Center City
Chisago City
Coates
Columbus
Cottage Grove
Dellwood
Eagan
Falcon Heights
Farmington
Forest Lake
Gem Lake
Goodhue
Grant
Harris
Hastings
Hugo
Inver Grove Heights
Lake City
Lake Elmo
Lakeland
Lakeland Shores
Lake St. Croix Beach
Landfall
Lindstrom
Lino Lakes
Little Canada
Mahtomedi
Maplewood
Marine on St. Croix
Mendota Heights
Miesville
New Brighton
New Trier
Newport
North Branch
North Oaks
North St. Paul
Oak Park Heights
Oakdale
Pine Springs
St. Marys Point
St. Paul
St. Paul Park
Scandia
Shoreview
South St. Paul
Stacy
Stillwater
Taylors Falls
Red Wing
Rosemount
Roseville
Vadnais Heights
Vermillion
Wabasha
Welch
West Lakeland
West St. Paul
White Bear Lake
Willernie
Withrow
Woodbury
Wyoming

See also
 List of North American area codes

References

Area code history. AreaCode-Info.com.
(2001). 1947 Area Code Assignment Map. GIF image at AreaCode-Info.com.

External links
NANPA Area Code Map of Minnesota
 List of exchanges from AreaCodeDownload.com, 651 Area Code

651
651
Telecommunications-related introductions in 1998